I Like Your Lovin' (Do You Like Mine?) is the second studio album by American soul group The Chi-Lites, produced and largely written by lead singer Eugene Record. The album was released in 1970 on the Brunswick label.

History
Although the album is always categorized in discographies as an original release, it contains only three new tracks, the remaining seven being recycled from the group's 1969 debut album Give It Away.  It is believed that Brunswick decided to release the album in this form due to the group not having recorded enough material for a completely new album at the time the title track was released as a single.  (This strategy would be repeated in 1975, when the group's album Half a Love was released with an even split of new and previously released tracks).  It was an unsuccessful move, as I Like You Lovin' (Do You Like Mine?) is the only Chi-Lites album for Brunswick which failed to register in the top 100 of either the R&B or the pop chart.

"Are You My Woman? (Tell Me So)", a moderate hit at the time of its original single release, has since become one of the group's best-known tracks after its horn riff was sampled heavily on Beyoncé's 2003 global bestseller "Crazy in Love".

Track listing

 Tracks 3-5, 7-10 also appear on Give It Away

Personnel
Marshall Thompson – baritone vocals
Robert "Squirrel" Lester – second tenor vocals
Creadel "Red" Jones – bass vocals
Eugene Record – producer, arranger, tenor/baritone vocals
Sonny Sanders – arranger
The Peoples' Paraphernalia – arrangers
Willie Henderson – director

Charts

Notes

References

External links
I Like Your Lovin' (Do You Like Mine) at Discogs

1970 albums
The Chi-Lites albums
Brunswick Records albums
Albums produced by Eugene Record